Weltmeister is an electric car brand owned by WM Motor Technology Co Ltd, a Shanghai-based automotive company specialised in the creation of battery electric vehicles (BEV's). In 2017, Weltmeister started a partnership with German specialty automaker and design service provider Isdera to design and produce electric cars, with the 2018 Isdera Commendatore GT being the first vehicle developed as a result of this partnership and was unveiled at the 2018 Beijing Auto Show. It launched its first production car, the EX5 in May 2018 at the Beijing Auto Show, with deliveries starting in September 2018. WM investors include Chinese technology companies Baidu and Tencent. Weltmeister vehicles are manufactured at WM Motor's self owned and operated manufacturing facility in Wenzhou, Zhejiang Province, which has an annual capacity of 100,000 units. WM Motor also maintains R&D facilities in China, Germany and the USA.

WM Motor is expected to release its next pure electric SUV model, the EX6, at the 2019 Guangzhou Auto Show, followed by a new 7-Series sedan at Auto China in April 2020.

Weltmeister is a "world champion" in German language.

History
WM Motor was founded in January 2015 by Freeman Shen, a former executive at Geely and later Chairman of Volvo's China operations. Prior to WM, Freeman also co-founded and was CEO of Pateo Group, a leading vehicle connectivity and telematics company.

In November 2016, the company commenced construction of its first plant in Wenzhou, Zhejiang Province. The facility has been mass-producing the company's first vehicle model, the EX5, since 28 September 2018.

In August 2017, WM Motor acquired Polarsun Automobile, a licensed passenger vehicles manufacturer in China, and subsequently gained the relevant licenses to produce all types of passenger NEVs.

In January 2018, the company began construction of its second manufacturing facility in Huanggang, Hubei Province.

Manufacturing

Wenzhou Plant 

Construction of the facility began in September 2016, and mass production commenced on 28 September 2018.

Huanggang Plant 
WM Motor's second manufacturing facility in Huanggang, Hubei Province, is currently under construction and scheduled for completion in early 2020.

Mobile App - GETnGO 
WM Motor operates a proprietary app called GETnGO, which is primarily aimed at offering search, navigation and payment options for public chargers in China. As of October 2019, the GETnGO app had registered 200,000 public chargers to the service through its partnerships with public charging providers, including the State Grid.

Models
 Weltmeister E5 (2021–present), an electric compact sedan
 Weltmeister EX5 (2018–present), an electric compact SUV
 Weltmeister EX6 (2019–present), an electric mid-size SUV
 Weltmeister W6 (2021–present), an electric compact SUV

References

External links
 

Car brands
Chinese brands
Cars of China
Chinese companies established in 2015
Vehicle manufacturing companies established in 2015
Luxury motor vehicle manufacturers
Electric vehicle manufacturers of China